An osteoma (plural: "osteomata") is a new piece of bone usually growing on another piece of bone, typically the skull. It is a benign tumor.

When the bone tumor grows on other bone it is known as "homoplastic osteoma"; when it grows on other tissue it is called "heteroplastic osteoma".

Osteoma represents the most common benign neoplasm of the nose and paranasal sinuses.  The cause of osteomata is uncertain, but commonly accepted theories propose embryologic, traumatic, or infectious causes.  Osteomata are also found in Gardner's syndrome. Larger craniofacial osteomata may cause facial pain, headache, and infection due to obstructed nasofrontal ducts.  Often, craniofacial osteoma presents itself through ocular signs and symptoms (such as proptosis).

Variants
 "Osteoma cutis, Unfortunately there is currently no way of detecting if and when this is likely to occur.
 "Fibro-osteoma"
 "Chondro-osteoma"

See also
 Osteosclerosis
 Familial adenomatous polyposis
 Exostosis
 Gardner syndrome
 Ganglion cyst

References

External links 
  - Osteoid osteoma
  -  Osteoma cutis
 Humapth #4724 (Pathology images)

Osseous and chondromatous neoplasia